Hortonville is an unincorporated community in Otero County, New Mexico, United States.

Notes

Unincorporated communities in Otero County, New Mexico
Unincorporated communities in New Mexico